Breitenthal is a municipality in the district of Günzburg in Bavaria in Germany. The Oberrieder Weiher, a in the region Mittelschwaben popular greenbelt recreation area, is in the municipal area of Breitenthal.

References

Populated places in Günzburg (district)